Andrew Bernard Cook (born August 30, 1967) is a former professional baseball pitcher. He pitched in four games in Major League Baseball for the New York Yankees in 1993.

A native of Memphis, Tennessee, he attended Christian Brothers High School and the University of Memphis. In 1988, he played collegiate summer baseball with the Chatham A's of the Cape Cod Baseball League. He was selected by the Yankees in the 11th round of the 1988 MLB Draft.

References

Sources

Major League Baseball pitchers
New York Yankees players
Oneonta Yankees players
Prince William Cannons players
Albany-Colonie Yankees players
Columbus Clippers players
Salt Lake Buzz players
Baseball players from Tennessee
1967 births
Living people
Memphis Tigers baseball players
Chatham Anglers players